"The Devil Went Down to Georgia" is a song written and performed by the Charlie Daniels Band and released on their 1979 album Million Mile Reflections.

The song is written in the key of D minor. Although uncredited, Vassar Clements originally wrote the basic melody an octave lower, in a tune called "Lonesome Fiddle Blues" released on Clements' self-titled 1975 album on which Charlie Daniels played guitar. The Charlie Daniels Band moved it up an octave and put words to it. The song's verses are closer to being spoken rather than sung (i.e., recitation), and tell the story of a young man named Johnny, in a variant on the classic deal with the Devil. The performances of the Devil and Johnny are played as instrumental bridges. The song was the band's biggest hit, reaching No. 3 on the Billboard Hot 100, prevented from further chart movement by "After the Love Has Gone" by Earth, Wind and Fire and "My Sharona" by The Knack.

Content
The song tells a story about the Devil's failure to gain a young man's soul through a fiddle-playing contest. The song begins as a disappointed Devil arrives in Georgia, apparently "way behind" on stealing souls, when he comes upon a young man named Johnny who is playing a fiddle, and quite well. Out of desperation, the Devil, who claims to also be a fiddle player, wagers a fiddle of gold against Johnny's soul to see who is the better fiddler.  Although Johnny believes taking the Devil's bet might be a sin, he fearlessly accepts, confidently boasting that "I'm the best that's ever been."

The Devil plays first, backed by a band of demon musicians. When he has finished, Johnny compliments him ("Well, you're pretty good, old son.") and takes his own turn, rendering at least four old-time songs, named (though not played) in the Charlie Daniels Band recording—the third of the four being identified not by title, but by an excerpt of its lyrics:
"Fire on the Mountain," the name of an early 19th-century fiddle tune, and also the name of Daniels' 1974 album,
"The House of the Rising Sun," a traditional American southern folk song,
"Chicken in the bread pan pickin' out dough," which was famously used in Bob Wills & His Texas Playboys' song "Ida Red," and 
"Granny Will Your Dog Bite."

Realizing he has been defeated, the devil lays his golden fiddle at Johnny's feet. Johnny then invites the devil to "c'mon back if y'ever wanna try again" before repeating his claim to be "the best that's ever been".

Reception
Cash Box praised the "engaging narrative story line" and said the song has "thundering piano", "screaming fiddle work", "pounding drums and screeching guitar". Record World said that Daniels "administers heavy doses of both [storytelling and fiddle-playing] with producer John Boylan capturing the excitement like no one else can."

Censorship 
Johnny's final boast, from the album version of the song, goes, "I done told you once, you son of a bitch, I'm the best that's ever been".  But to accommodate radio airplay for Country and Top 40 formats, Daniels changed the lyric for the single release to, "'Cause I told you once, you son of a gun", though AOR stations continued to use the unaltered version.

Musical references
The ballad's story is a derivative of the traditional deal with the Devil motif. Charlie Daniels has stated in interviews, "I don't know where it came from, but it just did. Well, I think I might know where it came from, it may have come from an old poem called 'The Mountain Whippoorwill' that Stephen Vincent Benét wrote many, many years ago (1925), that I had in high school."

Personnel
Charlie Daniels - guitar, fiddle, vocals
Tom Crain - guitar, vocals
"Taz" DiGregorio - keyboards, vocals
Fred Edwards - drums, percussion
James W. Marshall - drums, percussion
Charles Hayward - bass

Parodies and covers

The Levellers released a version of the song in 1991.
Although it is frequently misattributed to David Allan Coe or "Weird Al" Yankovic, the musician Travis Meyer performed a parody entitled "The Devil Went to Jamaica" circa 1998, in which Johnny is recast as a Jamaican drug dealer who is challenged by the devil to a pot-smoking contest to see whose marijuana is best: his, or Johnny's.
On a 1980 The Muppet Show episode (Episode 420), the Muppet versions of the Devil and Johnny are portrayed in an opening number cover of the song.
The rap group K.M.C. Kru released a hip hop re-imagining of the song entitled "The Devil Came Up to Michigan" in 1991, featuring the devil and a deejay competing for a turntable of gold.
In the 2000 movie Coyote Ugly, the original song version by the Charlie Daniels Band is sung and danced to as an on-bar line dance by the troupe of female bartenders.
Steve Ouimette (with Ed DeGenaro and Geoff Tyson) performed a cover of the song for the 2007 video game Guitar Hero III: Legends of Rock and, eventually, his 2010 album Epic. This version uses electric guitars instead of fiddles, though the original lyrics are still performed. It is played as the conclusion of the game in a simulated guitar battle with the devil. Daniels objected to this version on the grounds that the devil may win the contest, which he referred to as "violating the very essence of the song".
In 2013, the Boston-based roots rockers Adam Ezra Group recorded a parody version, "The Devil Came up to Boston", with Boston-focused lyrics. In this version's official music video, group leader Adam Ezra, who wrote the lyrics to the parody, narrates it with an exaggerated version of his real-life Boston accent, and the Devil is depicted as a New York Yankees fan, playing off the historic rivalry between the Yankees and Boston Red Sox.
The pop singer and electric violinist Michelle Lambert recorded a version of the song in 2015, and released a music video. In her rendition "Johnny" is replaced by "Michelle".
A cappella group Home Free recorded a version of the song in collaboration with Taylor Davis and Charlie Daniels playing fiddle, released in September 2015. The narration is performed by Home Free bass singer Tim Foust.
The rock band Blues Traveler often performs this song in concert, with John Popper playing the fiddle parts on harmonica. They featured a live version of the song on their 2006 EP ¡Bastardos en Vivo!
Robot Chicken featured a composite parody of the song along with the animated series Spawn in episode 49 of season 3, where Malebolgia, an infernal lord, is challenged by Spawn to a fiddle duel set to a similar tune.
In the Futurama episode "Hell is Other Robots", Leela must challenge the robot devil in a fiddle-playing contest to win back Bender's soul. Also included as a prize for the winner of the contest is a solid gold fiddle.
The funk metal band Primus covered the song and featured it, in the form of a stop motion animated music video, on a CD-ROM that was included with the 1998 release of their EP Rhinoplasty.
British Punk band The Toy Dolls recorded a version called 'The Devil Went Down to Scunthorpe', which used a guitar duel instead of a fiddle duel between Johnny and the Devil.
The Christian parody band ApologetiX recorded a parody called "The Devil Went Down to Jordan" which records the Devil's attempt to tempt Jesus in the wilderness.
British comedy folk band The Bar-Steward Sons of Val Doonican recorded a version called 'The Devil Went Down To Barnsley', in which the devil has a fiddle duel with Bjorn Doonicansson.
The American metal band Nature of Rebel Minds  released a cover of the song in 2019 and released an official music video to youtube as well. 
The American nu metal band Korn recorded a cover of the song in 2020 which featured the band playing the devil and rapper Yelawolf as Johnny.
The Canadian rock band Nickelback recorded a cover in 2020 with Dave Martone. This version uses electric guitars instead of fiddles, tuned down a whole step, and contains the original lyrics with slight changes.
A metal version of the song was recorded by Leo Moracchioli for his YouTube channel, Frog Leap Studios. The video was publicly released on July 17, 2020.
A cover of the song titled "Devil Comes Back to Georgia" was done by Johnny Cash singing updated lyrics with violin performed by Mark O'Connor in 1993.
 In 1996, the indie rock band Mono Puff released their studio album Unsupervised, which spawned a single "The Devil Went Down to Newport".
 The Zac Brown Band perform the song regularly in concert, and included a version on their 2009 EP Live from Bonnaroo

Chart performance
The original version of the song spent fourteen weeks on the Hot Country Singles charts in 1979, peaking at number 1 and holding the position for one week. It spent two weeks at a peak of number 3 on the Billboard Hot 100.  The single was certified Platinum by the RIAA on December 20, 1989, for sales of over two million copies in the United States. In 2003, the song was ranked at #69 on CMT's 100 Greatest Songs of Country Music, and #5 on CMT's 20 Greatest Southern Rock Songs in 2006. Since it became available as a download in the digital era, it has also sold 2.49 million digital copies in the US as of November 2019. In June 1998, Epic Records re-released the song to country radio, but accidentally sent out the version in which the line "son of a bitch" was uncensored. This error was quickly corrected, and the song re-entered the country charts at number 62 for the chart dated June 20, 1998. It spent seven weeks on the chart and peaked at number 60.

Weekly charts

Year-end charts

Certifications

Sequel  

In 1993, a sequel to the song, "The Devil Comes Back to Georgia", was released by master violinist Mark O'Connor on his album Heroes. The song featured Daniels on fiddle, with Johnny Cash as the narrator, Marty Stuart as Johnny, and Travis Tritt as the devil. The song peaked at #54 on Billboard's Hot Country Songs chart in 1994.

In the sequel, the devil, still furious ten years after being beaten, decides to take up Johnny's challenge to "c'mon back if y'ever wanna try again". Johnny is now grown with a wife and infant son, and the devil believes that Johnny's sinful pride will be his undoing, so he takes back the golden fiddle, forcing Johnny to practice with his old fiddle before their rematch – the same one he played when he defeated the devil. 
 
Though the song reiterates Johnny's bold claim that he is "the best that's ever been", the lyrics do not reveal who won the rematch. But in the video, the devil is shown defeated by Johnny again.

See also
 "Cross Road Blues"
 Faust
 "The Devil and Daniel Webster"
 "The Devil and Tom Walker"
 "The Devil's Dream"

References

External links
 

1979 singles
1979 songs
2020 singles
Charlie Daniels songs
Epic Records singles
Songs written by Charlie Daniels
Song recordings produced by John Boylan (record producer)
Songs about Georgia (U.S. state)
Music based on the Faust legend